Petr Polodna (born March 30, 1982) is a Czech professional ice hockey player who currently plays with HC Kometa Brno in the Czech Extraliga.

References

External links

Czech ice hockey forwards
HC Kometa Brno players
Living people
1982 births
Sportspeople from Písek
HC Litvínov players
Piráti Chomutov players
SK Horácká Slavia Třebíč players
BK Havlíčkův Brod players
Gothiques d'Amiens players
Basingstoke Bison players
JKH GKS Jastrzębie players
HC Olomouc players
Czech expatriate ice hockey people
Czech expatriate sportspeople in France
Czech expatriate sportspeople in England
Czech expatriate sportspeople in Poland
Expatriate ice hockey players in France
Expatriate ice hockey players in England
Expatriate ice hockey players in Poland